Helinand of Perseigne was a Cistercian monk and writer. He was the procurator of the Perseigne Abbey during the abbacy of Adam. He wrote a commentary on the Book of Revelation, mentioned by John of Wales around 1280. It is now lost. Some preserved glosses on the Book of Exodus are also attributed to him.

Réjane Molina has advanced the theory that Helinand of Froidmont spent time at Perseigne before moving to Froidmont and that consequently the two authors are in fact one person.

References

French Cistercians